The 2003 European Championship Tour (or the 2003 European Beach Volleyball Tour) was the European beach volleyball tour for 2003. This was the first year of the European Championship Tour.

The 2003 tour consisted of three tournaments with both genders, including the 2003 Championship Final.

Tournaments
Zagreb Challenger, in Zagreb, Croatia – 20–22 June 2003
Greek Open, in Rethymnon, Greece – 9–13 July 2003
2003 European Championship Final, in Alanya, Turkey – 27–31 August 2003

Tournament results

Women

Men

Medal table by country

References

 

European
Nestea European Championship Tour